Petko Lazarov (born 28 October 1935) is a former Bulgarian basketball player. He competed in the men's tournament at the 1960 Summer Olympics.

References

External links

1935 births
Living people
Bulgarian men's basketball players
1959 FIBA World Championship players
Olympic basketball players of Bulgaria
Basketball players at the 1960 Summer Olympics
Sportspeople from Plovdiv